Alsophila fulgens, synonym Cyathea fulgens, is a species of tree fern native to Cuba, Jamaica and Hispaniola. It forms part of the complex centered on Alsophila woodwardioides comprising six very similar taxa from the Greater Antilles. The other five species are Alsophila jimeneziana (syn. Cyathea crassa), Alsophila grevilleana, Alsophila portoricensis and Alsophila tussacii. Large and Braggins (2004) note that this group is known to cross with members of the Alsophila minor complex. In the wild, A. fulgens also forms hybrids with Alsophila brooksii.

References

fulgens
Flora of Cuba
Flora of the Dominican Republic
Flora of Haiti
Flora of Jamaica
Flora without expected TNC conservation status